The Ringkirche (Ring Church) is a Protestant church in Wiesbaden, the state capital of Hesse, Germany. The Romanesque Revival church was built between 1892 and 1894 and designed by Johannes Otzen. The historic monument also serves as a concert venue.

History 

The Ringkirche was the first Protestant church in Germany to follow the Wiesbadener Programm, which focused on a clear view from every seat to the combined altar, pulpit, organ and choir areas. It was built between 1892 and 1894 and designed by Johannes Otzen, one of the authors of the Wiesbadener Programm. Its organ was built by Walcker, with a Romantic disposition, of which 75% is again intact today. The organ was modified to a neo-Baroque disposition in 1949, but restored to its original disposition by major restoration from 2015, leaving not one of the c. 1,800 pipes untouched. Around a quarter of them were replaced. and the others were repaired.

The Romanesque Revival church is located on the Ringstraße between the central districts of Westend and Rheingauviertel. Its twin towers dominate the intersecting   .

A building of the Gründerzeit, the church was declared a German Nationaldenkmal (national monument) in 2002. It demonstrates a uniform style, reminiscent of the period between Romanesque and Gothic architecture, unaltered by destruction in wars or later remodeling. The building was extensively restored beginning in 2003. It is used for church concerts, such as a venue of the Rheingau Musik Festival.

Literature 
 Baedeker Wiesbaden Rheingau, Karl Baedeker GmbH, Ostfildern-Kemnat, 2001
 Gottfried Kiesow, Das verkannte Jahrhundert. Der Historismus am Beispiel Wiesbaden, Deutsche Stiftung Denkmalschutz, 2005
 Ralf-Andreas Gmelin, Der Dom der kleinen Leute – Ein Wiesbadener Geburtsort der Moderne, Ring Edition Wiesbaden, 2004

References

External links

 
 Ringkirche (in German) kirchen-wiesbaden.de

Revival architectural styles
Protestant churches in Wiesbaden
Churches completed in 1894